Rangia is a genus of bivalve molluscs or clams in the subfamily Mactrinae of the family Mactridae.

Species
There are three species:
 Rangia cuneata (G. B. Sowerby I, 1832) – Atlantic rangia
 Rangia flexuosa (Conrad, 1840) – Brown rangia
 Rangia mendica  (Gould, 1851)
Synonyms
 Rangia cyrenoides Des Moulins, 1832: synonym of Rangia cuneata (G. B. Sowerby I, 1832)

References

 Coan, E. V.; Valentich-Scott, P. (2012). Bivalve seashells of tropical West America. Marine bivalve mollusks from Baja California to northern Peru. 2 vols, 1258 pp.

External links
 Sowerby, G. B. I. (1821-1834). The genera of recent and fossil shells, for the use of students, in conchology and geology. Published in 42 numbers.
 Gill, T. (1895). Rangia the proper name of the mactroid genus Gnathodon. The Nautilus. 8(9): 102-103

Mactridae
Bivalve genera
Taxa named by Charles des Moulins